The Valley Wildcats are a Canadian junior ice hockey franchise from the Annapolis Valley region of Nova Scotia. The team is a member of the Maritime Junior A Hockey League and plays in the EastLink Division. They play their home games in the Kings Mutual Century Centre in Berwick, Nova Scotia.

History
The Antigonish Bulldogs were founded in 1967 as members of the Antigonish-Pictou-Colchester Junior B Hockey League.  After two seasons the league became the Northumberland Junior B Hockey League. In 1974, the Bulldogs became a founding member of what became the Eastern Junior A Hockey League, but returned to the Northumberland League in 1975. The Bulldogs would win league titles and provincial titles in 1979, 1981, 1982, 1983, 1984, and 1985. They would also win the Don Johnson Cup as Atlantic Junior B Champions in 1983 and 1984, the first team to ever win the Cup back-to-back. In 1987 they jumped to the Metro Valley Junior A League, which became the MJAHL in 1991.

The franchise was known as the Antigonish Bulldogs for 40 years. After it was decided that operating in Antigonish, Nova Scotia was no longer viable, the franchise was sold to a Metro Halifax group and then relocated to that city in the summer of 2008. The team's nickname, then, as the Halifax Lions was announced on August 22, 2008. The name is a tribute to the successful Halifax Lions teams of the 1980s. 

In 2010, the team was relocated to Dartmouth, Nova Scotia and renamed again as the Metro Marauders. Two years later, it was renamed the Metro Shipbuilders.

In 2013 it was announced that the Halifax Regional Municipality was losing Junior A hockey, due to low attendance rates in the area. The Metro franchise's move to the valley area of Nova Scotia was confirmed by the league's board of governors ahead of the 2013 MHL draft on June 15. The franchise was renamed the Valley Wildcats and was based in Kentville, Nova Scotia.

On April 5, 2014 it was announced that the franchise would be relocating once again, this time from Kentville to Berwick, Nova Scotia but will remain as the Valley Wildcats.

Season-by-season record

External links
Official Wildcats website

See also
List of ice hockey teams in Nova Scotia

Maritime Junior Hockey League teams
Ice hockey teams in Nova Scotia
1967 establishments in Nova Scotia
Ice hockey clubs established in 1967